Afflicted was a technical death metal band from Sweden, active in the early 1990s. They were part of the Swedish death metal scene, though overshadowed by better-known bands like Entombed and Dismember.

Members
Michael Van Der Graaf - vocals
Jesper Thorsson - guitar
Joacim Carlsson - guitar
Philip Von Segebaden - bass
Yasin Hillborg - drums

Discography
Prodigal Sun (Nuclear Blast, 1992)
Dawn of Glory (Massacre Records, 1995)

References

External links 
 Afflicted, Encyclopaedia Metallum

Swedish death metal musical groups
Musical groups established in 1992
Musical groups disestablished in 1995
Musical quintets
Swedish power metal musical groups